Félix Enríquez Alcalá (sometimes credited as Felix Alcala) (born March 7, 1951 in Bakersfield, California) is an Argentinean-American film and television director.

Career
Alcalá's first major breakthrough came in 1991 when he was hired by Lynn Marie Latham and Bernard Lechowick to direct an episode of ABC's short lived drama series Homefront. Since then he has guest directed on a vast number of series including CSI: Crime Scene Investigation, ER, Dollhouse and House. In 1997, Alcalá made his theatrical film directing debut with the film Fire Down Below starring Steven Seagal.

In 2007, Alcalá was nominated for Outstanding Directing for a Drama Series at the 59th Primetime Emmy Awards for directing the Battlestar Galactica episode Exodus, Part II

Selected directing credits

 Lois & Clark: The New Adventures of Superman – 1 episode, 1994
 NYPD Blue – 1 episode, 1994
 ER – 12 episodes, 1994–2007
 Seduced and Betrayed - TV movie, 1995
 77 Sunset Strip - TV movie, 1995
 Sliders – 1 episode, 1995
 Space: Above and Beyond – 2 episodes, 1995
 Deadly Pursuits - TV movie, 1996
 Fire Down Below – theatrical film
 Justice League of America – TV movie, 1997
 The Taking of Pelham One Two Three - TV movie, 1998
 Brimstone – 5 episodes, 1998–1999
 Third Watch – 17 episodes (consultant), 1999–2004
 M.K.3 - TV movie, 2000
 Flashpoint - TV movie, 2002
 John Doe – 1 episode, 2002
 Taken – 1 episode, 2002
 The Guardian – 2 episodes, 2003
 CSI: Crime Scene Investigation – 1 episode, 2003
 CSI: Miami – 1 episode, 2004
 The Shield – 2 episodes, 2003–2004
 Jonny Zero – 2 episodes, 2005
 Law & Order: Special Victims Unit – 1 episode, 2005
 The Unit - 1 episode, 2006
 House M.D. – 1 episode, 2006
 Battlestar Galactica – 2 episodes, 2006
 Battlestar Galactica: Razor – TV movie
 Criminal Minds – 18 episodes, 2005-2016
 Terminator: The Sarah Connor Chronicles – 1 episode, 2008
 Dollhouse – 2 episodes, 2009
 Breaking Bad – 1 episode, 2009
 The Good Wife – 12 episodes, 2010–2016
 Stargate Universe – 1 episode, 2010
 Castle – 1 episode, 2010
 Covert Affairs – 11episodes, 2010–2014
 Blue Bloods - 4 episodes, 2010-2012
 Southland – 4 episodes, 2010–2013
 Sword - short film, 2011
 Suits - 3 episodes 2011-2013
 Grimm - 1 episode, 2012
 NYC 22 – 1 episode, 2012
 Revolution - 1 episode, 2012
 Person of Interest - 1 episode, 2012
 The Tomorrow People - 1 episode, 2013
 Gang Related - 1 episode, 2014
 State of Affairs - 1 episode, 2015
 Resurrection - 1 episode, 2015
 Defiance - 1 episode, 2015
 Satisfaction - 1 episode, 2015
 Agent X - 1 episode, 2015
 Madam Secretary - 13 episodes, 2015-2019
 Second  Chance - 2 episodes, 2016
 Quantico - 1 episode, 2016
 Criminal Minds: Beyond Borders – 1 episode, 2016
 BrainDead - 1 episode, 2016
 Shades of Blue - 2 episodes, 2017
 SEAL Team - 1 episode, 2017
The Brave - 1 episode, 2017
 Mayans MC - 1 episode, 2018
 Manifest - 1 episode, 2018
 The Good Fight - 1 episode, 2019
 How to Get Away with Murder - 1 episode, 2019
 Charmed - 1 episode, 2020
 The Lost Symbol - 2 episodes, 2021
 Promised Land - 1 episode, 2022
 9-1-1: Lone Star - 1 episode, 2023

References

External links
 

1951 births
Living people
American cinematographers
Hispanic and Latino American film directors
American film directors of Mexican descent
American television directors
Film directors from California
People from Bakersfield, California